Kabba-Modou Cham (born 25 December 1992) is a former professional football player who last played for Royal Cappellen. Born in Belgium, he is a youth international for the Gambia.

He has also played competitively for KVV Coxyde and KSV Bornem, as well as abroad for Scottish club Greenock Morton and Mosta in Malta.

Club career
Cham started his career with various youth sides back home in Belgium, namely VW Hamme, K.V. Mechelen and latterly Sint-Truiden.

He signed for Greenock Morton in July 2013 on a two-year contract, and made his first competitive debut for Morton in a 1–0 defeat in the Scottish Challenge Cup to Annan Athletic.

Cham ingratiated himself with the Morton support after he scored a double against arch-rivals St Mirren in the Renfrewshire Cup final. Cham was released from his contract in February 2014 by mutual consent.

Personal life
Cham was born in Belgium to a Greek mother and a Gambian father and has elected to represent Gambia at international level. To date, he has made one appearance for the Under-20 side in a 2011 African Youth Championship group match against Nigeria.

His maternal grandfather is Greek but moved to Belgium, where the striker's mother, Panayoula Kontoyannis, was born meaning that Cham is also eligible to represent Greece at international level.

See also
Greenock Morton F.C. season 2013–14

References

External links

Living people
Greenock Morton F.C. players
1992 births
Footballers from Antwerp
Gambian footballers
The Gambia youth international footballers
Belgian footballers
People with acquired Gambian citizenship
Association football forwards
Sint-Truidense V.V. players
Belgian expatriate footballers
Expatriate footballers in Scotland
K.V. Mechelen players
Scottish Professional Football League players
Black Belgian sportspeople
Gambian people of Greek descent
Belgian people of Gambian descent
Belgian people of Greek descent
Belgian sportspeople of African descent
Expatriate footballers in Malta
Challenger Pro League players
Royal Cappellen F.C. players